"You Must Not Be Drinking Enough" is a song recorded by American country music artist Earl Thomas Conley.  It was released in October 1989 as the fifth single from the album The Heart of It All.  The song reached #26 on the Billboard Hot Country Single & Tracks chart.  The song was written by Danny Kortchmar.

The song was first released by Don Henley in 1984 under the title "You're Not Drinking Enough" on the album Building the Perfect Beast.

Personnel 
 Don Henley – lead vocals, drums 
 David Paich – acoustic piano 
 Danny Kortchmar – organ, Omnichord, guitars 
 Tim Drummond – bass 
 Sam Moore – harmony vocals

Chart performance

References

1989 singles
1984 songs
Don Henley songs
Earl Thomas Conley songs
Song recordings produced by Emory Gordy Jr.
RCA Records singles